Reprieve from Paradise is a science fiction novel by American writer H. Chandler Elliott. It was published in 1955 by Gnome Press in an edition of 4,000 copies.

Plot introduction
The novel is set after an atomic war and the world is run by Polynesians.  The hero discovers a plot to turn the earth on its axis in order to create an Antarctic utopia.

References

 

1955 American novels
American science fiction novels
Novels set in Antarctica
Gnome Press books